Arden Lim Cho (born August 16, 1985) is an American actress, singer and model known for portraying Kira Yukimura in the 2011 MTV television series Teen Wolf and Ingrid Yun in the 2022 Netflix television series Partner Track.

Early life and education
Cho was born in Amarillo, Texas to Korean-American parents and was raised in San Antonio and Plano, Texas. Growing up in areas with few ethnic minorities, she often felt like an outsider. As a child, she was bullied and was hospitalized twice for injuries after being physically attacked. She later attended high school in Apple Valley, Minnesota.

Cho attended the University of Illinois Urbana-Champaign with the intentions of becoming a lawyer. It was there that she took her first drama classes and developed an interest in the profession. There, she also became more exposed to the Asian American culture at large; she also participated in the Asian American Association's Fashion Show. She graduated in 2007 with a Bachelor of Arts degree in psychology and subsequently spent the following summer on a medical missionary trip in Kenya.

Career

Acting 
Upon her return from Kenya, she moved to Los Angeles, where she worked odd jobs while trying to pursue a career in acting. Although she did not have any screen credits at the time, her first agent took her on due to her resume of musical and physical talents, which included ballet, cello, piano, amongst others. Cho has appeared in films, television series, and commercials in the United States and Asia.

In 2008, Cho played the grown-up lead of Hyori (the younger version being played by Megan Lee) in the short film My First Crush, directed by Rocky Jo.

In 2011, she appeared in the role of Pru, a friend of Paige McCullers (Lindsey Shaw) in Season 1, Episode 20 ("Someone to Watch Over Me"), of the ABC Family show Pretty Little Liars. She also appeared in the role of Gia in the monster film Mega Python vs. Gatoroid, directed by Mary Lambert.

In 2014, Cho joined the TV series Teen Wolf as Kira, starting as a recurring character in season 3 but was promoted to a main cast role in season 4. In April 2016, ahead of her talk at University of Illinois at Chicago for Asian American Awareness Month, Cho posted a YouTube video on her personal channel revealing that she would not return for season 6 of Teen Wolf.

In 2017, Cho was cast as a recurring character on season 3 of Chicago Med as Dr. Ethan Choi's sister.

In 2022, Cho starred as the lead character Ingrid Yun in the Netflix series Partner Track.

YouTube 
Cho was previously a part of the "Artichoke and Peachies" joint YouTube blogging channel with Grace Su. The account has since been shut down. She has also appeared in the web series KTown Cowboys.

She has her own YouTube channel, ardenBcho, with over 300 videos, predominantly featuring vlogging, song covers, and original music videos. She had over 500,000 subscribers as of February 2020.

Modeling
Cho won the 2004 Miss Korea Chicago competition, giving her the opportunity to take part in the Miss Korea Pageant in Seoul. At one point, she was in talks for a television show in Korea but walked away from the opportunity due to weight loss and plastic surgery requirements.

In 2010, the cosmetic brand Clinique announced Cho as the model for their newest advertisement campaign in Asia. The campaign was launched in mid-November 2010. Cho modeled for Reebok Korea in 2010 and for Nike Japan in 2008. She has also modeled for Apple and Alexander McQueen and appeared in Vogue, Purple Fashion and Nylon Magazine.

Music
In 2010, Cho and Ktown Cowboys actor Shane Yoon were the MCs for the Korean music group JYJ's tour in the United States.

In 2011, Cho released her first single, "I'm Just a Girl". Cho was the co-writer, composer and singer; Ed Huang was co-writer and music producer. On February 25, 2011, Cho released a self-produced music video for the single on YouTube featuring Tim Lacatena. Cho had plans to tour her debut EP My True Happy in 2013 before landing a recurring role on Teen Wolf. Cho premiered her single "Simply" in September 2019.

Other ventures 
Cho is an avid poker player and has been playing since 2002. She competed in the 2018 World Series of Poker, placing 662nd with $21,750.

On February 6, 2019, it was announced that Cho had become CEO of Leonard & Church, a New York City-based watch company.

Personal life
Cho is a Christian. Cho has a black belt in taekwondo and grew up training with her father, who is a grandmaster.

In April 2021, in the midst of an uptick in anti-Asian racism regarding the COVID-19 pandemic, Cho said she was walking her dog when a man called her slurs and threatened her life. She picked up her dog and ran when he approached her. She said the increase in hate crimes "has triggered a lot of these [childhood] memories".

Filmography

Film

Television

Video games

Web series

References

External links

Arden Cho on YouTube

Living people
1985 births
21st-century American actresses
21st-century American businesswomen
21st-century American businesspeople
Actresses from Dallas
Actresses from Minnesota
American female models
American film actresses
American models of Korean descent
American poker players
American television actresses
American video game actresses
Apple Valley High School (Minnesota) alumni
Female models from Minnesota
Female models from Texas
Female poker players
People from Amarillo, Texas
People from Dakota County, Minnesota
University of Illinois Urbana-Champaign alumni